Dust corners are triangle-shaped pieces, usually made of brass or nickel, that are used to prevent dust from accumulating in corners. Stair dust corners are used on staircases at the point where the tread, riser, and stringer meet. Dust corners make household chores such as sweeping and vaccuming more convenient. Stair dust corners originated during the Victorian era. Dust corners typically have a small hole in the middle so a nail can be hammered into the stairs.

See also
Dust bunny
Broom
Stairs
Stair tread
Vacuum cleaner

References

Cleaning
Dust
Stairs